The day-night average sound level (Ldn or DNL) is the average noise level over a 24-hour period. The noise level measurements between the hours of 10pm and 7am are artificially increased by 10 dB before averaging. This noise is weighted to take into account the decrease in community background noise of 10 dB during this period. There is a similar metric called day-evening-night average sound level (Lden or DENL) commonly used in other countries, or community noise exposure level (CNEL) used in California legislation; that is, the DNL with the addition of an evening period from 7 PM to 10 PM when noise level measurements are boosted 5 dB (or 4.77 dB in the case of CNEL) to account for the approximate decrease in background community noise during this period. 

In the US, the Federal Aviation Administration has established this measure as a community noise exposure metric to aid airport noise analyses under Federal Aviation Regulation Part 150. The FAA says that a maximum day-night average sound level of higher than 65 dB is incompatible with residential communities. Communities in affected areas may be eligible for mitigation such as soundproofing.

See also
Aircraft noise
Effective perceived noise in decibels rating of aircraft
Noise pollution
Noise measurement
Day–evening–night noise level, the EU equivalent

References

United States administrative law
Federal Aviation Administration
Aviation law
Noise pollution
Sound measurements